AgroChem, Inc. is a privately owned manufacturing company located in Saratoga Springs, NY, that specializes in supplying chemicals and formulated products to dairy farms, including hoof care products, teat dips, and cleaning products. The company currently employs approximately 30 people and averages 10 – 20 million dollars in sales annually.

History 
The company was founded in 2005 by John DeMarco and his son, Robert DeMarco. AgroChem leased production space in W. J. Grande Industrial Park until purchasing five acres in the park in 2016 to build their current facility, which takes up 38,000 sq. ft. The firm maintains warehouses in Wisconsin, Texas, California, and Canada. The DeMarcos also own Biosan, which produces peracetic acid as an alternative to chlorine bleach, and operates out of the same plant as AgroChem, Inc.

Products 
AgroChem, Inc. produces Healmax, a topical antiseptic available as a spray, foam, or footbath concentrate to promote healthy hooves. The product is patented in the U.S., New Zealand, and Canada.
Other products include teat dips, which are placed on a cow’s udder to keep bacteria out of milk and help prevent mastitis. The chemical products are regulated by the FDA and sold around the world to customers in Russia, Japan, United Kingdom, Korea and western Europe through over 100 distributors. International sales accounted for roughly 15 percent of overall sales in 2015.

References 

Dairy farming equipment manufacturers
Saratoga Springs, New York
Manufacturing companies based in New York (state)
Manufacturing companies established in 2005
American companies established in 2005
2005 establishments in New York (state)